Grosse Pointe North High School is a public high school in Grosse Pointe Woods, Michigan, a suburb of Detroit. North is a four-year comprehensive high school with an enrollment of around 1,400 and expected 2016 graduating class of 350. Classes are in session for 182 days per year and the school day is from 8:00 AM to 3:05 PM.

The principal is Kate Murray; she won the 2015 Educators Voice Award. The assistant principals are Katy Vernier, Michelle Davis, and Geoffrey Harris Young. Davis is also the school's athletic director.

North consistently ranks among the nation's best high schools.
 North is ranked the 11th best public high school in Michigan on the 2017 Niche rankings.
 On The Washington Post's list of most challenging high schools, North is #14 in Michigan.
 Newsweek's list of top high schools places North #487 nationally.
The school opened in 1968 after Grosse Pointe High School was split into two schools, and Grosse Pointe North took the northern side of Grosse Pointe's students and Northeastern Harper Woods' students. It is a member of the Grosse Pointe Public School System.

Communities served and feeder patterns
The school serves the following communities: all of Grosse Pointe Woods, the GPPSS section of Harper Woods, a small northwest section of Grosse Pointe Farms, and the Wayne County section of Grosse Pointe Shores.

Three elementary schools, Ferry, Mason, and Monteith, feed into GPNHS. All of the attendance boundary of Parcells Middle School and a section of the boundary of Brownell Middle School coincides with that of GPNHS.

Athletics

Boys' sports include: baseball, basketball, crew, cross country, football, golf, ice hockey, lacrosse, sailing, soccer, swimming and diving, tennis, track and field, and wrestling. Girls sports include: basketball, cheerleading, crew, cross country, dance team, field hockey, golf, gymnastics, ice hockey, lacrosse, sailing, soccer, softball, swimming and diving, tennis, track and field, and volleyball. Grosse Pointe North has won numerous state championship titles: Baseball (1980, 2006), Girls' Basketball (2008), Boys' Cross Country (1973, 1975, 1976, 1982), Boys' Hockey (2001, 2002), Girls' Lacrosse (1999) and Girls' Swimming & Diving (1999).

Extracurricular clubs
Grosse Pointe North's Radio Astronomy Team, the "RATz", under Ardis Herrold, are credited as being the first high school group to build its own radio telescope from scratch in the United States.

The Quiz Bowl team won the Class A Michigan High School State Championship in 2010 and participates in many NAQT tournaments.  The team has attended the NAQT National High School Championship tournament (HSNCT).

Grosse Pointe North's Chemistry Club conducts research on the Flint water crisis with the chemistry department at the University of Detroit Mercy. They were the first high schoolers to present at a local and national American Chemical Society conference in 2017 and 2018, publishing their work shortly after. The group was also the first high school group to win a travel grant from the society to travel to the 256th national conference in 2018. The group also sent one of the only all-girls rocketry teams to the national Team America Rocketry Challenge in 2017, 2018, and 2019.

Notable alumni

 Gregg Alexander — Frontman of alternative rock band New Radicals
 Michael Bramos — Lega Basket Serie A basketball player with Reyer Venezia
 Robert Brooks Brown — Commanding general U.S. Army Pacific (USARPAC)
 Jared Lee Gosselin — Latin Grammy Award-winning producer
 David Legwand — Former NHL center with the Nashville Predators, Detroit Red Wings, Ottawa Senators, and Buffalo Sabres
 Andy Miele — NHL center with the Arizona Coyotes
 Mark Osler — Law professor at the University of St. Thomas School of Law
 Carly Piper — Olympic gold medal-winning swimmer at the 2004 Summer Olympics
 Corey Tropp — AHL right winger with the San Diego Gulls. Formerly with the Anaheim Ducks, Columbus Blue Jackets, and Buffalo Sabres of the NHL.
 Zach Werenski — NHL defenseman with the Columbus Blue Jackets
 Meg White — Drummer and singer of the White Stripes

References

External links

 The Grosse Pointe Public School System Web Page
 GPNHS annual report (PDF)

Educational institutions established in 1968
Public high schools in Michigan
Schools in Wayne County, Michigan
1968 establishments in Michigan